Jajachaca (possibly from Quechua qaqa rock, chaka bridge, "rock bridge") is mountain in the northern extensions of the Vilcanota mountain range in the Andes of Peru, about  high. It is located in the Cusco Region, Quispicanchi Province,  Ocongate District. Jajachaca lies southwest of Jolljepunco and Cinajara where the annual Quyllur Rit'i festival takes place.

References 

Mountains of Cusco Region
Mountains of Peru